Elizabeth Bartlett may refer to:

 Elizabeth Bartlett (British poet) (1924–2008), British poet
 Elizabeth Bartlett (American poet) (1911–1994), American poet and writer
 Elizabeth French Bartlett (1877–1961), American genealogist

See also
 Elizabeth Bartlet (disambiguation)